Moordown is a ward in Bournemouth, Dorset. Since 2019, the ward has elected 2 councillors to Bournemouth, Christchurch and Poole Council.

History 
The ward formerly elected councillors to Bournemouth Borough Council before it was abolished in 2019.

Geography 
Moordown ward covers the suburbs of Moordown and Charminster.

Election results

2019

References

External links 

 Listed buildings in Moordown ward

Wards of Bournemouth, Christchurch and Poole